This is a table chart of the current deputy governors of Afghanistan. Like provincial governors, deputy governors are all and also appointed by the Emir of Afghanistan.

Deputy Governors

See also
 List of current provincial governors in Afghanistan
 List of current provincial police chiefs in Afghanistan
 List of current provincial judges in Afghanistan

References

Main
Deputy Governors
Deputy Governors of Afghanistan
People of the Islamic Republic of Afghanistan